Actinopus rufibarbis is a species of mygalomorph spiders in the family Actinopodidae. It is found Brazil.

References

rufibarbis
Spiders described in 1930